Bloomfield is a designated place in the Canadian province of Newfoundland and Labrador. It is on the east coast of the island of Newfoundland, approximately 230 kilometres from the capital city of St. John's and approximately 95 kilometres from Bonavista. Bloomfield is located in a non-tax district which falls underneath the community of Lethbridge.

The community was founded in 1860 by a man named Honeyburn.

Geography 
Bloomfield is in Newfoundland within Subdivision E of Division No. 7.

Demographics 

See also 
List of communities in Newfoundland and Labrador
List of designated places in Newfoundland and Labrador

References 

Populated coastal places in Canada
Designated places in Newfoundland and Labrador